An election for Members of the European Parliament representing Netherlands constituency for the 1989–1994 term of the European Parliament was held on 15 June 1989. It was part of the wider 1989 European election. Ten parties competed in a D'Hondt type election for 25 seats.

Background

Combined lists
Several parties combined in one list to take part in this European Election and increase their chance on a seat in the European Parliament.
These combined lists are:
 Rainbow of CPN and PSP, PPR
 SGP, RPF and GPV

Electoral alliances
No lists formed an electoral alliance

Voting right
All Dutch, everywhere in the world were granted voting rights this election. Except for the Dutch living in the Netherlands Antilles and Aruba, because they can vote for the Estates of the Netherlands Antilles. However, if the subject lived for 10 years or longer in the Netherlands they can still vote for the European Elections.

These people got right to vote in this fourth election for the European Parliament in 1989 in the Netherlands:
 Everyone who was allowed to vote in the Dutch parliament elections;
 Dutch who are resident anywhere in the world and did not already have voting rights for the Dutch Parliament elections; (except for Dutch living in the Netherlands Antilles and Aruba, because they vote for the Estates of the Netherlands Antilles. Dutch from the Netherlands Antilles en Aruba are allowed to vote for European Elections if they lived for at least 10 years in the Netherlands.)
 Subjects of one of the other Member States which have residence in the Netherlands. Provided that the state of which they are from granted the same.

Numbering of the candidates list

Results

In the election the conservative liberal VVD loses seats to the progressive liberal D66, who return to the European parliament after a five-year absence. 47.48% of the Dutch population turned out on election day.

European groups

| style="text-align:center;" colspan="11" | 
|-
|style="background-color:#E9E9E9;text-align:center;vertical-align:top;" colspan="3"|European group
!style="background-color:#E9E9E9" |Seats 1984
!style="background-color:#E9E9E9" |Seats 1989
!style="background-color:#E9E9E9" |Change
|-
| 
| style="text-align:left;" | European People's Party
| style="text-align:left;" | EPP
| style="text-align:right;" | 9
| style="text-align:right;" | 10
| style="text-align:right;" | 1 
|-
| 
| style="text-align:left;" | Confederation of Socialist Parties
| style="text-align:left;" | SOC
| style="text-align:right;" | 8
| style="text-align:right;" | 8
| style="text-align:right;" | 0 
|-
| style="background-color:gold;" width=0.3em|
| style="text-align:left;" | Liberal and Democratic Reformist Group
| style="text-align:left;" | LDR
| style="text-align:right;" | 5
| style="text-align:right;" | 4
| style="text-align:right;" | 1 
|-
| 
| style="text-align:left;" | Rainbow Group
| style="text-align:left;" | RBW
| style="text-align:right;" | 2
| style="text-align:right;" | 2
| style="text-align:right;" | 0 
|-
| 
| style="text-align:left;" | Non-Inscrits
| style="text-align:left;" | NI
| style="text-align:right;" | 1
| style="text-align:right;" | 1
| style="text-align:right;" | 0 
|-
|width="350" style="text-align:right;background-color:#E9E9E9" colspan="3"|
|width="30" style="text-align:right;background-color:#E9E9E9"| 25
|width="30" style="text-align:right;background-color:#E9E9E9"| 25
|width="30" style="text-align:right;background-color:#E9E9E9"| 0 
|}

Elected members 
Below are the members elected in the 1989 European elections.

Christian Democratic Appeal
Bouke Beumer
Pam Cornelissen
Jim Janssen van Raaij
Hanja Maij-Weggen
Ria Oomen-Ruijten
Arie Oostlander
Karla Peijs
Jean Penders (top candidate)
Jan Sonneveld
Maxime Verhagen

Dutch Labour Party
Hedy d'Ancona
Piet Dankert (top candidate)
Alman Metten
Hemmo Muntingh
Maartje van Putten
Wim van Velzen
Ben Visser
Eisso Woltjer

People's Party for Freedom and Democracy
Jessica Larive
Gijs de Vries (top candidate)
Florus Wijsenbeek

Rainbow of CPN, PSP and PPR
Nel van Dijk (CPN)
Herman Verbeek (PPR) (top candidate)

Democrats 66
Jan-Willem Bertens (top candidate)

SGP, RPF and GPV
Leen van der Waal (SGP) (top candidate)

MEPs period 1989–1994
Below is a complete list of members of the European Parliament for the period 1989–1994 as a result of this election.

References 

Netherlands
European Parliament elections in the Netherlands
1989 elections in the Netherlands